William F. Zion (October 23, 1872 – March 25, 1919) was a United States Marine private who received the Medal of Honor during the China Relief Expedition.

Biography
William Zion was born in Knightstown, Indiana on October 23, 1872. He served in the United States Marine Corps and later in the United States Army. In 1900, he was awarded the Medal of Honor for his "meritorious conduct" as a Marine in China.

He later become a United States Army First Lieutenant.

During World War I he was in charge of a German POW barracks in Fort Oglethorpe.

Zion died on March 25, 1919, of an apparent accidental gunshot wound inflicted while cleaning his weapon.  Lieutenant Zion is buried in the Chattanooga National Cemetery.

According to Sydney Gumpertz in his book The Jewish Legion of Valor, Zion was Jewish.

Medal of Honor citation
Rank and Organization: Private, U.S. Marine Corps. Born: October 23, 1872, Knightstown, Ind. Accredited to: California. G. O. No.: 55 July 19, 1901.

Citation:

In the presence of the enemy during the battle of Peking, China, July 21 to August 17, 1900. Throughout this period, Zion distinguished himself by meritorious conduct.

See also

List of Medal of Honor recipients

Notes

References

1872 births
1919 deaths
United States Marine Corps Medal of Honor recipients
United States Army officers
United States Marines
People from Knightstown, Indiana
American military personnel of the Boxer Rebellion
Boxer Rebellion recipients of the Medal of Honor
Firearm accident victims in the United States
Deaths by firearm in Georgia (U.S. state)
Accidental deaths in Georgia (U.S. state)
United States Army personnel of World War I